Acacia glutinosissima is a shrub belonging to the genus Acacia and the subgenus Phyllodineae that is endemic to western Australia.

Description
The branchlets have a rough texture formed by stem-projections where phyllodes were once attached. Caducous stipules that are linear and have a length of  also cover the branchlets. It has ascending to erect green to yellowish green phyllodes that are linear to shallowly incurved. It produces yellow flowers from July to September. The spherical flower-heads contained 40 to 55 densely pack golden flowers.

Distribution
It is native to an area in the Wheatbelt region of Western Australia where it is found on rises and on sandplains growing in gravelly, sandy and lateritic soils. It has a scattered distribution from around Wubin in the north to around Bruce Rock in the south growing in open scrub.

See also
List of Acacia species

References

glutinosissima
Acacias of Western Australia
Taxa named by Joseph Maiden
Taxa named by William Blakely
Plants described in 1928